is a Japanese variety show that was broadcast every Friday afternoon at 11 o’clock on TBS. It was first aired on October 3, 2003, and last aired on March 27, 2009.

External links 
 TBS Koisuru Hanikami official site (Japanese)

TBS Television (Japan) original programming